Chipmunk Punk is an album by the Chipmunks, as well as being the first album released by Ross Bagdasarian, Jr., after he took over the voices of the Chipmunks after the death of his father in 1972. Despite the title of the album, none of the songs listed are considered to be in the style of real punk rock music.  It was released on June 15, 1980 (see 1980 in music). The album peaked at No. 34 on the Billboard 200. It was certified gold by the RIAA on October 14, 1980, becoming the Chipmunks' first gold record. In 2005, it was re-released on CD, although the CD was only available through the official Chipmunks website. In Canada, the album reached No. 59.

History 
The inspiration for the album came when KMET DJ Chuck Taylor played the 12″ version of the Blondie song "Call Me" at 45 instead of 33 RPM and announced, in jest, that it was the Chipmunks' latest single. So many requests came for this "new" Chipmunks release, that Ross Bagdasarian Jr. and his collaborator Steve Vining rushed to record this album.

In addition to "Call Me," the album featured covers of songs by The Knack ("My Sharona," "Good Girls Don't," "Frustrated"), The Cars ("Let's Go"), Tom Petty and the Heartbreakers ("Refugee"), Billy Joel ("You May Be Right"), Queen ("Crazy Little Thing Called Love"), and Linda Ronstadt ("How Do I Make You").

Chipmunk Punk marked the rebirth of the Chipmunk franchise. It was the first new Chipmunk release since 1969's The Chipmunks Go to the Movies. Previous Chipmunk activity ceased in 1972 with the untimely death of franchise creator/producer Ross Bagdasarian Sr. (also known as David Seville) from a heart attack.

Though this release followed a long dormancy record-wise, the characters had returned to public view via Saturday morning repeats of the cartoon series The Alvin Show on NBC in 1979. The album sparked a second run of the characters and led to another Saturday morning cartoon series, Alvin and the Chipmunks, which began in 1983 and also aired on NBC.

Critical reception 

The album met mixed critical reviews. Doug Stone of Allmusic called it "good clean fun" which "if nothing else...provides a portrait of a prime period in radio," but Rolling Stone panned it, describing the album as a symptom of corporate greed in the world of television animation.

Most reviews of Chipmunk Punk criticized the track listing as featuring comparatively little punk rock in favor of more commercial pop rock and new wave music of the era. In 1994, comedy punk band The Radioactive Chicken Heads recorded a cover of Suicidal Tendencies "Institutionalized" in the style of Alvin and the Chipmunks specifically due to lead singer Carrot Top's dissatisfaction with the song choices on Chipmunk Punk.

Track listing

Vinyl/cassette 
Track listing per AllMusic.

Side one 
 "Let's Go" (Ric Ocasek)  – 3:35
 "Good Girls Don't" (Doug Fieger)  – 3:13
 "How Do I Make You" (Billy Steinberg)  – 2:23
 "Refugee" (Tom Petty, Mike Campbell)  – 3:07
 "Frustrated" (Berton Averre, Doug Fieger)  – 2:54
 contains an unlisted excerpt from "(I Can't Get No) Satisfaction" (Mick Jagger, Keith Richards).

Side two 
 "Call Me" (Debbie Harry, Giorgio Moroder) – 3:11
 "You May Be Right" (Billy Joel) – 4:03
 "Crazy Little Thing Called Love" (Freddie Mercury) – 2:39
 "My Sharona" (Berton Averre, Doug Fieger) – 4:03

CD 
 "Call Me" (Debbie Harry, Giorgio Moroder)  – 3:11
 "Refugee" (Tom Petty, Mike Campbell)  – 3:07
 "Frustrated" (Berton Averre, Doug Fieger)  – 2:54
 "You May Be Right" (Billy Joel)  – 4:03
 "Crazy Little Thing Called Love" (Freddie Mercury) – 2:47
 "My Sharona" (Berton Averre, Doug Fieger)  – 4:03
 "How Do I Make You...?" (Billy Steinberg)  – 2:23
 "Good Girls Don't" (Doug Fieger)  – 3:13
 "Let's Go" (Ric Ocasek)  – 3:35

Personnel

Musicians 
 Alvin Seville: vocals
 Simon Seville: vocals
 Theodore Seville: vocals
Danny Kortchmar: lead guitar
Tommy Organ: rhythm guitar
Leland Sklar: bass
Russ Kunkel: drums
Clarence McDonald: keyboards

Production 
 Steve Vining: Producer
 Bob McNabb: Engineer
 Ross Bagdasarian, Jr.: Production Consultant
 Doug Oudekerk: Cover Art

2005 CD Edition credits 
 Janice Karman: Reissue producer
 Spencer Chrislu: Digital remastering

References 

1980 albums
Alvin and the Chipmunks albums